Íñigo Eguaras Álvarez (born 7 March 1992) is a Spanish footballer who plays as a central midfielder for UD Almería.

Football career
Born in Ansoáin, Navarre, Eguaras graduated from Athletic Bilbao's youth setup after joining in 2004 from UDC Txantrea, and made his senior debuts with CD Basconia, the club's farm team, in the 2010–11 campaign, in Tercera División. On 10 June 2011 he was promoted to the reserves in Segunda División B.

On 26 May 2014 Eguaras was released by the Lions, and subsequently signed for Segunda División club CE Sabadell FC on 2 July. He played his first match as a professional on 24 August, starting in a 2–3 home loss against Real Betis.

Eguaras scored his first professional goal on 16 May 2015, netting the last in a 1–1 away draw against CD Leganés. On 17 July he signed for fellow league team CD Mirandés, after agreeing to a two-year deal.

On 19 June 2017, after suffering relegation, Eguaras moved to fellow second tier club Real Zaragoza. A regular starter, he renewed his contract until 2024 on 18 May 2020.

On 21 January 2022, Eguaras moved to fellow second division side UD Almería on a two-and-a-half-year deal.

Personal life
Íñigo's younger brother Aritz is also a footballer. A defender, he has appeared for several clubs in the Navarre region including CD Izarra.

References

External links

1992 births
Living people
People from Cuenca de Pamplona
Spanish footballers
Footballers from Navarre
Association football midfielders
Segunda División players
Segunda División B players
Bilbao Athletic footballers
CE Sabadell FC footballers
CD Mirandés footballers
Real Zaragoza players
UD Almería players